Vojislav Simić (Serbian Cyrillic: Војислав Симић), better known as "Bubiša", is a Serbian musician, conductor, composer and the pioneer of Serbian ethno-jazz.

Simić was born on March 18, 1924, in Belgrade, Yugoslavia, and is well known as a conductor of Belgrade's Television Jazz Orchestra, the composer of numerous jazz compositions, traditional liturgical choral and orchestral music, ethno-jazz compositions as well as children's music.

From 1953 to 1985, Simić and his Belgrade's Television Jazz Orchestra performed throughout Europe, collecting numerous awards and winning numerous competitions, including the well-known Juan Le Pen Jazz Festival in France, where they won first prize in 1960.

Simić was also a guest conductor in numerous theatres in the former Yugoslavia and guest composer at children's festivals throughout Serbia, being influenced by Jovan Jovanović Zmaj, the Serbian writer and poet.

References
Jakovljević, S. (2003): Jedan vek džeza & Kratki prilozi za izučavanje džeza u Srbiji, Knjižara Žagor, Beograd
Simić, V. B. (2006): Veselo putovanje: sa džez orkestrom RTV Beograd po belom svetu, Radio-televizija Srbije, Beograd

External links
Simić on muzickacentrala.com (Serbian)

1924 births
Living people
Serbian jazz bandleaders